Hallajabad (also Romanized as Ḩallājābād) is a village in Mahmudabad Rural District, Tazeh Kand District, Parsabad County, Ardabil Province, Iran. At the 2006 census, its population was 696, in 125 families.

References 

Towns and villages in Parsabad County